Munshinogla is a village in Bangladesh. It is located in Nangla Union of Melandaha Upazila, Jamalpur District.

References

Jamalpur District
Populated places in Mymensingh Division